Teimuraz II (T'eimuraz I Mukhranbatoni) (1649–1688) was the head of the Mukhrani branch of the royal Bagrationi dynasty of Kartli. He was Prince (batoni) of Mukhrani and ex officio commander of the Banner of Shida Kartli and Grand Master of the Household (msakhurt-ukhutsesi) at the court of Kartli from 1668 to 1688.  

Teimuraz was a son of Constantine I, Prince of Mukhrani, and his wife Darejan, daughter of Prince Ghuana Abashidze. He was married twice, first to a certain Ana and, second, Ketevan Orbeliani. He had four sons:
Otia (died 1719)
Adarnase died 1701)
Bagrat (died 1703)
Constantine II, Prince of Mukhrani (died 1716)

References

 ბაგრატიონები - სამეცნიერო და კულტურული მემკვიდრეობა" - თბ. 2003 მუხრან-ბატონთა და ბაგრატიონ-მუხრანელთა გენეალოგია
 მუხრანბატონთა გენეალოგიური ტაბულა (იური ჩიქოვანი, სოსო ბიჭიკაშვილი, დავით ნინიძე) - კრებული "არტანუჯი" N 5 - 1996 წ. - გვ.28-36

1649 births
1688 deaths
House of Mukhrani